Shadē Business is the debut solo studio album by American rapper PMD. It was released on September 27, 1994 via RCA Records. Production was handled by DJ Scratch, Charlie Marotta, The 45 King, Jesse West and PMD himself. It features guest appearances from 3rd Eye, Top Quality, Zone 7 and Das EFX. The album peaked at number 65 on the Billboard 200.

Track listing

Sample credits
 Track 1 contains a sample from "I've Been Watching You" by Southside Movement
 Track 4 contains samples from "Miss Lady Brown" by The Chambers Brothers
 Track 7 contains samples from "I Got a Thang, You Got a Thang, Everybody Got a Thang" by Funkadelic
 Track 8 contains samples from "Funky Worm" by Ohio Players
 Track 9 contains samples from "Bounce, Rock, Skate, Roll, Part 1" performed by Vaughan Mason & Crew

Notes
Track 11 is omitted in clean version.

Personnel
Parrish "PMD" Smith – main artist, producer (tracks: 1-6, 8-12), co-producer (track 13), recording & mixing (tracks: 1-6, 8-10)
Andre "Krazy Drayz" Weston – featured artist (track 5)
William "Skoob" Hines – featured artist (track 5)
Zone 7 – featured artists (track: 7, 14)
T. "Top Quality" Robinson – featured artist (tracks: 10, 14)
Jesse "3rd Eye" Williams – featured artist (tracks: 10, 14), producer & recording (track 14)
Al B. – featured artist (track 11)
Charlie Marotta – producer (track 6), recording (tracks: 1-11), mixing (tracks: 1-5, 7-11)
George "DJ Scratch" Spivey – scratches, producer (tracks: 7, 8), recording & mixing (tracks: 7, 11)
Mark "The 45 King" James – producer & mixing (track 13)
Norman G. Balla 'Kaotic' – mixing (track 13)
Lyle Owerko – art direction, design
Gary Spector – photography

Charts

References

External links

1994 debut albums
RCA Records albums
PMD (rapper) albums
Albums produced by DJ Scratch
Albums produced by the 45 King